Beames is a surname. Notable people with the surname include:

Adrienne Beames (born 1942), Australian long-distance runner
H. P. M. Beames (1875–1948), British mechanical engineer
Jack Beames (1890–1970), Welsh rugby union and rugby league player
John Beames (1837–1902), British civil servant, writer, historian and linguist
Margaret Beames (born 1935), New Zealand writer
Percy Beames (1911–2004), Australian rules footballer and cricketer

See also
Beam (disambiguation)